Beardslee Farm is a national historic district and farmstead located at Pittsfield in Otsego County, New York.  It encompasses five contributing buildings, one contributing site, and one contributing structure. It consists of the farmhouse, dependencies, and a small family cemetery.  The "L" shaped farmhouse is a large sprawling wood frame residence comprising three sections that reflects three separate building campaigns, ca. 1790, ca. 1800, and ca. 1810.  The main section is a two-story, five bay building with a center entrance and a gable roof.  Also on the property is a horse barn, carriage house, corn house, hop barn, and pump house.

It was listed on the National Register of Historic Places in 2000.

References

Historic districts on the National Register of Historic Places in New York (state)
Georgian architecture in New York (state)
Houses in Otsego County, New York
National Register of Historic Places in Otsego County, New York
Farms on the National Register of Historic Places in New York (state)